Indian Trees: An Account of Trees, Shrubs, Woody Climbers, Bamboos, and Palms Indigenous or Commonly Cultivated in the British Indian Empire is a monograph on the trees of India, written by the German–British botanist and forestry administrator Sir Dietrich Brandis and published in London in 1906 by Archibald Constable & Co.

An extensive work of 801 pages, the book is regarded as his magnum opus and a seminal work on Indian trees. Brandis was regarded as the "father of tropical forestry;" he worked with the British Imperial Forestry Service in colonial India for nearly 30 years, and served as Inspector General of Forests in India from 1864 to 1883.

See also
Trees of India
Flora of India

Bibliography
Sir Dietrich Brandis, Indian Trees: An Account of Trees, Shrubs, Woody Climbers, Bamboos, and Palms Indigenous or Commonly Cultivated in the British Indian Empire, London, Archibald Constable & Co., 1906

References

Flora of the Indian subcontinent
Botany books
Books about British India
1906 non-fiction books
1906 in biology